Bhavesh Seth (born 7 October 1997) is an Indian cricketer. He made his T20 debut on 18 October 2022, for Hyderabad against Delhi in the 2022–23 Syed Mushtaq Ali Trophy. He made his List A debut on 12 November 2022, for Hyderabad against Himachal Pradesh in the 2022–23 Vijay Hazare Trophy.

References

External links
 

1997 births
Living people
Indian cricketers
Hyderabad cricketers
Place of birth missing (living people)